Gilberto N. Morillo (born 1944) is Venezuelan scientist, author, and educator. He was known for botany. In 1995 he was chosen as an elected curator of Herbario Forestal (MER) of the University of the Andes in Mérida, Venezuela. Morillo had already been a curator of the Faculty of Pharmacy (MERF) from the same university and the National Herbarium of Venezuela in Caracas. He is a collector of Angiopspermaes, whose specimens are in the National Herbarium of Venezuela. He is currently a researcher with the highest number of scientific publications of the Faculty of Forestry and Environmental and global specialist in Asclepiadaceae and a consultant for prestigious journals in the field of botany. Species named after Morillo including Prestonia morilloi (Apocynaceae), Cynanchum morilloi, Macroditassa morilloana, Oxypetalum morilloanum, Lessingianthus morilloi, Acianthera morilloi and Piper morilloi.

Species and new genus
 Marsdenia manarae
 Tillandsia santieusebii
 Philibertia

Publications

Books 
 Morillo, Gilberto, Briceño, Benito, Silva F., Juan. 2000. Distribución de las Asterceae de los páramos venezolanos. Acta Bot. Venez. 23 (1): 47-68
 Morillo, Gilberto, Briceño, Benito, F Silva, Juan. 2010. Botánica y ecología de las Monocotiledóneas de los Páramos en Venezuela. Volumen 1. Editor Instituto de Ciencias Ambientales y Ecológicas, Universidad de Los Andes, Facultad de Ciencias. p 296. 
 Morillo, Gilberto, Briceño Benito. 2006. Catálogo de las plantas con flores de los Páramos de Venezuela: Parte U. Monocotiledóneas (Liliopsida). Acta Bot Venez. 29 (1): 89-134.
 Morillo, Gilberto. 1987. Flora del Parque Nacional Henri Pittier. Editor N. Martinez. 39 pp

References 

1944 births
Living people
English-language writers
20th-century Venezuelan botanists
Venezuelan educators
Venezuelan novelists
Venezuelan male writers
Male novelists
21st-century Venezuelan botanists
20th-century male writers